Darhupal (also Romanized as Darhūpal; also known as Darhapal) is a village in Qilab Rural District, Alvar-e Garmsiri District, Andimeshk County, Khuzestan Province, Iran. At the 2006 census, its population was 50, in 9 families.

References 

Populated places in Andimeshk County